Khao Kradong Forest Park is a forest park in Buriram Province. The site of the park is a former volcano. Near the top of the volcano is the Suphatthara Bophit Buddha image.

External links
 Photo of Suphatthara Bophit Buddha image
 Forest Park 
 Photos and view of Buriram from Khao Kradong 

Buriram province
Forest parks of Thailand